John "Casey" Holt was an American basketball player, part of the New York Renaissance, which was also known as the Harlem Rens.

The Rens were elected to the Basketball Hall of Fame in 1963 as a team, with three of the players and their coach also being selected as individuals.  Holt was a member of the 1932–33 team that won 88 straight games and was called the magnificent 7.

See also

Black Fives

References

Year of birth missing
Place of birth missing
Year of death missing
Place of death missing
New York Renaissance players